The Caproni PS.1, also known as the Pallavicino PS-1 and Caproni Ca.303, was an Italian four-seater sportsplane, designed and built specifically to compete in Challenge 1934, the European touring plane championships.

Design and development 
The PS.1 was designed by Cesare Pallavicino, the former designer of Breda, after he had moved in 1933 to Caproni. Only two prototypes of the PS.1 were built, given registrations I-FRAN and I-MELO.

Description 
The Caproni PS.1 was a four-seat cabin aircraft of metal construction, with cantilever monoplane low wings. The steel-framed fuselage was covered with fabric as were the single-sparred trapezoidal planform foldable wings of steel construction which had rounded tips. The cabin had two side-by-side seats in front with dual controls, and two seats in the rear, under a common multi-part canopy. A retractable conventional landing gear with a rear skid was fitted with the mainwheels protruding from the wing's lower surface when retracted. The radial engine was fitted to the fuselage nose, enclosed by a cowling, driving a two-bladed propeller. Fuel was housed in a 160-litre fuel tank.

Operational history 

Both aircraft took part in the Challenge 1934 contest, flown by Armando François and Ugo Vincenzi. In a technical evaluation, the PS-1 took second place behind the Messerschmitt Bf 108 (the PS-1 and Bf 108 were the only Challenge aircraft with retractable landing gear). The aircraft were completed only shortly before the contest, so their pilots had little time for training. During a short landing trial, Vincenzi damaged his engine and propeller, and he had to withdraw. Armando François completed the contest in 18th place (for 34 starting and 19 finishing crews).

The second PS.1, I-MELO, was rebuilt in the late 1930s and redesignated Caproni Ca.166, given the registration I-ALGU.

Specifications (PS.1)

See also

Notes

References 

 
 

PS01
1930s Italian sport aircraft
Single-engined tractor aircraft
Low-wing aircraft
Aircraft first flown in 1934